The Garland Lakes are a chain of eight small alpine glacial lakes and several former lakes in Custer County, Idaho, United States, located in the White Cloud Mountains in the Sawtooth National Recreation Area.  The lakes are located on the upper portion of the Big Casino Creek watershed, a tributary of the Salmon River.  The lakes have not been individually named, and Sawtooth National Forest trails 646 and 616 lead to the lakes.  The Garland Lakes are south of Rough Lake and east of the Casino Lakes.

References

See also

 List of lakes of the White Cloud Mountains
 Sawtooth National Forest
 Sawtooth National Recreation Area
 White Cloud Mountains

Lakes of Idaho
Lakes of Custer County, Idaho
Glacial lakes of the United States
Glacial lakes of the Sawtooth National Forest